This is a list of the extreme points of Azerbaijan, the points that are farther north, south, east or west than any other location.

Latitude and longitude

Azerbaijan 

This section includes only the central contiguous section of Azerbaijan.

 North : Khachmaz Rayon
 South : near Tangov, Astara
 West :
 near Inkinci Sixli, Qazakh
 The nearby enclave of Yuxari Askipara, is marginally further west
 East : Jiloy, Baku

Nakhchivan 

This section includes only the exclave of Nakhchivan.

 North :
 near Gunnut, Sharur
 The enclave of Karki extends slightly further north
 South : Ordubad
 West : Sadarak Rayon
 East : Ordubad

Altitude 
 Maximum : Bazardüzü Dağı, 4485 m
 Minimum : Caspian Sea (Xəzər dənizi), -28 m

See also 

Extreme points of Earth
Geography of Azerbaijan

Geography of Azerbaijan
Azerbaijan
Extreme